Christopher Marrero (born July 2, 1988) is a Cuban-American former professional baseball outfielder and first baseman. He played for the Washington Nationals and the San Francisco Giants in Major League Baseball (MLB) and for the Orix Buffaloes of Nippon Professional Baseball (NPB).

Professional career

Washington Nationals 
A 2006 graduate of Monsignor Edward Pace High School in Miami, Florida, Marrero was selected by the Washington Nationals with the 15th overall pick in the 2006 amateur draft and signed for a bonus of $1.625 million. Marrero and former teammate Gio González briefly played together during their high school years at Monsignor Edward Pace High School when Gonzalez transferred there in 2004.

Marrero spent the 2006 season with the GCL Nationals, Washington's affiliate in the rookie-level Gulf Coast League. In 2007, he played on Potomac Nationals, a high A team where he hit third spot and played first base.  He began the 2008 season with the extended spring training team from the Washington Nationals and eventually ended up playing for the Potomac Nationals again. His second minor league season was cut short when he suffered a broken right fibula on 18 June 2008.

Marrero was called up to the majors for the first time on August 27, 2011. He was outrighted off the Nationals roster on October 24, 2013.

Baltimore Orioles 
Marrero signed a minor league deal with the Baltimore Orioles on December 10, 2013.

Chicago White Sox 
Marrero signed a minor league deal with the Chicago White Sox on June 5, 2015, after starting the 2015 season with the Somerset Patriots. He was released by the White Sox on August 6, 2015.

Boston Red Sox 
On August 14, 2015 the Boston Red Sox signed Marrero to a minor league contract. He started 2016 with the Triple-A Pawtucket Red Sox, where he won the International League Home Run Derby, and also earned MVP honors in the league's 4–2 victory over the Pacific Coast League at the Triple-A All-Star Game. He played the 2015 and 2016 seasons with his cousin, infielder Deven Marrero.

San Francisco Giants 
On November 10, 2016, Marrero signed a minor league contract with the San Francisco Giants. After a strong spring training, he was named to the Giants' 25-man opening day roster for 2017. On April 14, 2017, he hit his first major league home run off Tyler Anderson of the Colorado Rockies. He was designated for assignment on April 24.

Orix Buffaloes 
On May 24, 2017, Marrero signed with the Orix Buffaloes of Nippon Professional Baseball. Marrero resigned with the Orix Buffaloes for the 2018 season.

On December 2, 2019, he became a free agent.

Personal life 
Marrero is the nephew of former major-leaguer Eli Marrero, and has two other family members in professional baseball; his brother Christian Marrero and his cousin Deven Marrero.

References

External links 

1988 births
Living people
American expatriate baseball players in Japan
American sportspeople of Cuban descent
Auburn Doubledays players
Baseball players from Miami
Birmingham Barons players
Bowie Baysox players
Bravos de Margarita players
American expatriate baseball players in Venezuela
Charlotte Knights players
Gulf Coast Nationals players
Hagerstown Suns players
Harrisburg Senators players
Leones de Ponce players
Major League Baseball first basemen
Mayos de Navojoa players
American expatriate baseball players in Mexico
Nippon Professional Baseball designated hitters
Norfolk Tides players
Orix Buffaloes players
Pawtucket Red Sox players
Phoenix Desert Dogs players
Potomac Nationals players
Sacramento River Cats players
San Francisco Giants players
Somerset Patriots players
Syracuse Chiefs players
Tigres del Licey players
American expatriate baseball players in the Dominican Republic
Washington Nationals players
Monsignor Edward Pace High School alumni